Emil von Behring (Emil Adolf von Behring), born Emil Adolf Behring (15 March 1854 – 31 March 1917), was a German physiologist who received the 1901 Nobel Prize in Physiology or Medicine, the first one awarded in that field, for his discovery of a diphtheria antitoxin. He was widely known as a "saviour of children," as diphtheria used to be a major cause of child death. His work with the disease, as well as tetanus, has come to bring him most of his fame and acknowledgment. He was honored with Prussian nobility in 1901, henceforth being known by the surname "von Behring."

Biography
Behring was born in Hansdorf, Kreis Rosenberg, Province of Prussia (now Ławice, Iława County, Poland). His father was a schoolmaster; the family had 13 children.

Between 1874 and 1878, he studied medicine at the Kaiser-Wilhelm-Akademie in Berlin, an academy for military doctors, since his family could not afford the university. As a military doctor, he studied the action of iodoform. Due to his work on Neurotomia opticociliaris (or optociliary neurotomy), Behring became a doctor from the institute and later was able to pass his exam for licensed work in his area of Marburg. In 1878, his service required him to be sent to Poland where he focused on septic diseases. His potential was becoming well known to many. This led to his commanded return to Prussia to study with Robert Koch. He was employed by the military as he received his grants and money from the Prussian army. For each semester of education, he owed 1 year of service as a military surgeon. This accumulated to 2 years, from 1881 to 1883 as he served under the Second Hussar regiment. A lesser known part of his studies was his research in ophthalmology and how he furthered the understanding of the eye and its diseases. He wrote a paper during his time at Wicherkiewicz's hospital in Poznan from 1881 to 1883 on an eye tumor case that ended up with the patient dying from leukemia, but it did allow for much needed research on treatments for the eye and what the preferred pathways for surgery would be. He learned under some of the great ophthalmologists like Carl Ernst Schweigger and Wilhelm Uhthoff, leading to his interest in the subject and his writing his doctoral dissertation on it.

In 1890 he published an article with Kitasato Shibasaburō reporting that they had developed "antitoxins" against both diphtheria and tetanus. They had injected diphtheria and tetanus toxins into guinea-pigs, goats and horses; when these animals developed immunity, they derived antitoxins (now known to contain antibodies) from their serum. This process would be called serum therapy by him at the time as he described it as a way to induce permanent immunity or "to stimulate the body's internal disinfection". These antitoxins could protect against and cure the diseases in non-immunized animals. In 1892 he started the first human trials of the diphtheria antitoxin, but they were unsuccessful. Successful treatment started in 1894, after the production and quantification of antitoxin had been optimized. During 1894, Behring was also awarded the Cameron Prize for Therapeutics of the University of Edinburgh.

In 1895 he became Professor of Hygienics within the Faculty of Medicine at the University of Marburg, a position he would hold for the rest of his life. He and the pharmacologist Hans Horst Meyer had their laboratories in the same building, and Behring stimulated Meyer's interest in the mode of action of tetanus toxin.

Behring won the first Nobel Prize in Physiology or Medicine in 1901 for the development of serum therapies against diphtheria. He was elected a Foreign Honorary Member of the American Academy of Arts and Sciences in 1902.

In 1904 he founded the Behringwerke in Marburg, a company to produce antitoxins and vaccines.

At the International Tuberculosis Congress in 1905 he announced that he had discovered "a substance proceeding from the virus of tuberculosis." This substance, which he designated "T C," plays the important part in the immunizing action of his "bovivaccine", which prevents bovine tuberculosis. He tried unsuccessfully to obtain a protective and therapeutic agents for humans.

Behring died at Marburg, Hessen-Nassau, on 31 March 1917. His name survived in the Dade Behring organisation (now part of the Siemens Healthineers), in CSL Behring, a manufacturer of plasma-derived biotherapies, in Novartis Behring and in the Emil von Behring Prize of the University of Marburg, the highest endowed medicine award in Germany.

His Nobel Prize medal is now kept on display at the International Red Cross and Red Crescent Museum in Geneva.

Controversy
Von Behring is believed to have cheated Paul Ehrlich out of recognition and financial reward in relation to collaborative research in diphtheria. The two men developed a diphtheria serum by repeatedly injecting the deadly toxin into a horse. The serum was used effectively during an epidemic in Germany. A chemical company preparing to undertake commercial production and marketing of the diphtheria serum offered a contract to both men, but von Behring maneuvered to claim all the considerable financial rewards for himself. To add insult to injury, only Behring received the first Nobel Prize in Medicine, in 1901, for his contributions. However, Ehrlich would go on to win the 1908 Nobel Prize in Medicine for his contribution to immunology.

Personal life
They had six sons. They held their honeymoon at villa "Behring" on Capri 1897, where Behring owned a vacation home. In 1909–1911, the Russian writer Maxim Gorky lived at this villa.

Publications
 Die Blutserumtherapie (1892)
 Die Geschichte der Diphtherie (1893)
 Bekämpfung der Infektionskrankheiten (1894)
 Beiträge zur experimentellen Therapie (1906)
 E. v. Behring's Gesammelte Abhandlungen (1915) Digital edition by the University and State Library Düsseldorf

See also
 German inventors and discoverers

References
 

 
 Ulrike Enke: Salvatore dell'Infanzia Behring and Capri
 Christoph Hans Gerhard : Trias deutschen Forschergeistes Emil von Behring Pflaum-Verlag / Munich Naturheilpraxis 71.Jahrgang January, 2018

Notes

External links
  including the Nobel Lecture on December 12, 1901 Serum Therapy in Therapeutics and Medical Science
 www.uni-marburg.de/behring-digital
 

1854 births
1917 deaths
People from Iława County
German immunologists
German physiologists
Humboldt University of Berlin alumni
German military doctors
German Nobel laureates
Nobel laureates in Physiology or Medicine
People from the Province of Prussia
Academic staff of the University of Marburg
Fellows of the American Academy of Arts and Sciences
Physicians of the Charité
Tetanus
Diphtheria